Skalino is a rural locality (a village) in Rostilovskoye Rural Settlement, Gryazovetsky District, Vologda Oblast, Russia. The population was 37 as of 2002.

Geography 
Skalino is located 40 km south of Gryazovets (the district's administrative centre) by road. Polyanka is the nearest rural locality.

References 

Rural localities in Gryazovetsky District